João Miguel Xavier Ferreira dos Santos (born 14 September 1993), commonly known as João Miguel, is a Portuguese professional footballer who plays as an defender for Penafiel.

Club career
Miguel signed for Romanian club Argeș Pitești in 2022. In his career, João Miguel also played for teams such as S.C. Salgueiros, U.D. Leiria or C.D. Mafra.

References

1993 births
People from Maia, Portugal
Sportspeople from Porto District
Living people
Portuguese footballers
Association football defenders
S.C. Salgueiros players
Anadia F.C. players
U.D. Leiria players
C.D. Mafra players
FC Argeș Pitești players
F.C. Penafiel players
Campeonato de Portugal (league) players
Liga Portugal 2 players
Liga I players
Portuguese expatriate footballers
Portuguese expatriate sportspeople in Romania
Expatriate footballers in Romania